Orik is a patrol vessel of the Albanian Navy Brigade, built by the Damen Group in the Pasha Liman naval shipyard.
She was the second Damen Stan 4207 patrol vessel to be built, and was commissioned in 2011.  She was built in Albania.

Jane's Naval Construction and Retrofit Markets reported that Albania had ordered a total of four vessels.
She was ordered to perform search and rescue duties, as well as coastal patrol.

References

Iliria-class patrol vessels
2011 ships
Ships built in Albania